The Syilx people, also known as the Okanagan, Okanogan or Okinagan people, are a First Nations and Native American people whose traditional territory spans the Canada–US boundary in Washington state and British Columbia in the Okanagan Country region. They are part of the Interior Salish ethnological and linguistic grouping.  The Syilx are closely related to the Spokan, Sinixt, Nez Perce, Pend Oreille, Secwepemc and Nlaka'pamux peoples of the same Northwest Plateau region.

History
At the height of Syilx culture, about 3000 years ago, it is estimated that 12,000 people lived in this valley and surrounding areas. The Syilx employed an adaptive strategy, moving within traditional areas throughout the year to fish, hunt, or collect food, while in the winter months, they lived in semi-permanent villages of kekulis, a type of pithouse.

When the Oregon Treaty partitioned the Pacific Northwest in 1846, the portion of the tribe remaining in what became Washington Territory reorganized under Chief Tonasket as a separate group from the majority of the Syilx, whose communities remain in Canada.  The Okanagan Tribal Alliance, however, incorporates the American branch of the Syilx. The latter are part of the Confederated Tribes of the Colville, a multi-tribal government in Washington state.

The bounds of Syilx territory are roughly the basin of Okanagan Lake and the Okanagan River, plus the basin of the Similkameen River to the west of the Okanagan valley, and some of the uppermost valley of the Nicola River.  The various Syilx communities in British Columbia and Washington form the Okanagan Nation Alliance, a border-spanning organization which includes American-side Syilx residents in the Colville Indian Reservation, where the Syilx are sometimes known as Colvilles.

The Upper Nicola Indian Band, a Syilx group of the Nicola Valley, which was at the northwestern perimeter of Okanagan territory, are known in their dialect as the Spaxomin, and are joint members in a historic alliance with neighbouring communities of the Nlaka'pamux in the region known as the Nicola Country, which is named after the 19th-century chief who founded the alliance, Nicola.  This alliance today is manifested in the Nicola Tribal Association.

Customs
One of the unique customs of the Okanagan people was their propensity to sing when giving thanks for food and for healing.

Language

The language of the Syilx people is Nsyilxcən. "Syilx" is at the root of the language name Nsyilxcən, surrounded by a prefix and suffix indicating a language. Nsyilxcən is an Interior Salish language that is spoken across the Canadian and U.S.A. border in the regions of southern British Columbia and northern Washington. This language is currently endangered and has only 50 fluent speakers remaining.

Governments
Okanagan Nation Alliance
Westbank First Nation (Westbank) (Tqłəníw̓t/Sn̓qatqłəníw̓t)
Lower Similkameen Indian Band (Keremeos) (N̓iʔxʷín̓aʔ)
Upper Similkameen Indian Band (Keremeos) (Tk̓r̓miw̓s)
Osoyoos Indian Band (Swiw̓s)
Penticton Indian Band (Sn̓pin̓tktn̓)
Okanagan Indian Band (Vernon) (N̓k̓maplqs)
Upper Nicola Indian Band (Douglas Lake) - also part of the Nicola Tribal Association (Spax̌mn̓)
Confederated Tribes of the Colville (sx̌ʷy̓ʔiłpx sqlxʷúlaʔxʷ)

See also
Okanagan Trail
Nicola (Okanagan leader)
Mourning Dove (author)

References

Further reading
Armstrong, Jeannette, and Lee Maracle, Okanagan Rights Committee; Delphine Derickson, Okanagan Indian Education Resource Society, We Get Our Living Like Milk from the Land, Theytus Books, 1994
Available online through the Washington State Library's Classics in Washington History collection Includes: Okanagon tales by James A. Teit and Okanagon tales by Marian K. Gould.
 Carstens, Peter. The Queen's People: A Study of Hegemony, Coercion, and Accommodation Among the Okanagan of Canada. Toronto: University of Toronto Press, 1991. 
 Robinson, Harry, and Wendy C. Wickwire. Nature Power: In the Spirit of an Okanagan Storyteller. Vancouver: Douglas & McIntyre, 1992.

External links

Map of Okanagan territory
Okanagan Tribal Alliance Homepage (Syilx.org)
"Original People", a Syilx account of their history
Westbank First Nation homepage
Okanagan Indian Band homepage
Penticton Indian Band homepage
Osoyoos Indian Band homepage
Lower Similkameen Indian Band homepage
Upper Nicola Indian Band homepage
The bear woman: Okanagan legend about a woman kidnapped by a grizzly bear
Dirty boy: Okanagan legend about a woman who married the sun

 
Interior Salish
Native American history of Washington (state)
History of British Columbia
Native American tribes in Washington (state)